Karim Benounes (born 9 February 1984) is an Algerian international footballer. He plays as a midfielder.

Career
Benounes was born in Lille, France. On 28 February 2010, he made his league debut for Hungarian team Vasas SC in a 3–2 loss to Nyíregyháza Spartacus.

References

External links

1984 births
Living people
Footballers from Lille
Association football midfielders
French sportspeople of Algerian descent
Algerian footballers
Algeria under-23 international footballers
Algeria international footballers
Lille OSC players
Ølstykke FC players
Al Kharaitiyat SC players
ES Sétif players
Entente SSG players
Zhejiang Professional F.C. players
Vasas SC players
Egri FC players
CS Constantine players
Chinese Super League players
Qatar Stars League players
Nemzeti Bajnokság I players
PK-35 Vantaa (men) players
Algerian expatriate footballers
Expatriate men's footballers in Denmark
Expatriate footballers in Qatar
Expatriate footballers in China
Expatriate footballers in Hungary
Expatriate footballers in Finland
Algerian expatriate sportspeople in Denmark
Algerian expatriate sportspeople in Qatar
Algerian expatriate sportspeople in China
Algerian expatriate sportspeople in Hungary
Algerian expatriate sportspeople in Finland